Kingsley Pele van Anholt (born 23 April 1991) is a Dutch footballer who plays as a full back. Van Anholt is of Curaçaoan-Ghanaian descent.

Club career
Van Anholt started his career with SC Heerenveen, where he played six seasons. He also formerly played on loan for FC Emmen.

Van Anholt signed with Major League Soccer club LA Galaxy on 12 July 2017. Pele played five games with LA Galaxy before tearing his MCL and ACL on 29 August 2017 in a 3–0 loss to San Jose Earthquakes. His 2018 contract option was declined by the LA Galaxy on 27 November 2017.

References

External links
 

1991 births
People from Sneek
Footballers from Friesland
Living people
Dutch footballers
Dutch people of Curaçao descent
Dutch sportspeople of Ghanaian descent
Association football fullbacks
SC Heerenveen players
FC Emmen players
Willem II (football club) players
LA Galaxy players
NAC Breda players
Enosis Neon Paralimni FC players
Eredivisie players
Eerste Divisie players
Major League Soccer players
Cypriot First Division players
Dutch expatriate footballers
Expatriate soccer players in the United States
Dutch expatriate sportspeople in the United States
Expatriate footballers in Cyprus
Dutch expatriate sportspeople in Cyprus